The medial arcuate ligament (also medial lumbocostal arch and internal arcuate ligament) is a tendinous fascia that arches over the psoas major muscle as it passes posterior the diaphragm.

Structure
The medial arcuate ligament is an arch in the fascia covering the upper part of the psoas major.  It is attached to the side of the body of the first or second lumbar vertebra, laterally, it is fixed to the front of the transverse process of the first and, sometimes also, to that of the second lumbar vertebra.

It lies between the lateral arcuate ligament and the midline median arcuate ligament.

The sympathetic chain enters the abdomen by passing deep into this ligament of the diaphragm. This is in contrast to the parasympathetic Vagus nerve which passes through the esophageal hiatus.

See also
 Lateral arcuate ligament
 Median arcuate ligament

References

External links
 
 

Ligaments of the torso
Thoracic diaphragm